Cholesterol-5,6-oxide hydrolase (cholesterol-epoxide hydrolase, ChEH) is an enzyme with systematic name 5,6alpha-epoxy-5alpha-cholestan-3beta-ol hydrolase. This enzyme catalyses the following chemical reaction

 (1) 5,6alpha-epoxy-5alpha-cholestan-3beta-ol + H2O  5alpha-cholestane-3beta,5alpha,6beta-triol
 (2) 5,6beta-epoxy-5beta-cholestan-3beta-ol + H2O  5alpha-cholestane-3beta,5alpha,6beta-triol

The enzyme works equally well with either epoxide as substrate on rat liver microsomes.  The ChEH is an intracellular en membranous enzyme localized mainly on the endoplasmic reticulum of cells. Its molecular characterization revealed it is composed of two proteinaceous sub-units: the 3beta-hydroxysteroid delta8-delta7-isomerase (D8D7I), also known as the emopamyl binding protein (EBP), which is the catalytic subunit, and the 3beta-hydroxysteroid delta7 reductase (DHCR7), which is the regulatory subunit. The ChEH is the "so called" microsomal antiestrogen binding site (AEBS), a secondary target of the antitumor drug tamoxifen and related compounds. The ChEH is inhibited by different pharmacological classes of drugs including anticancer drugs such as tamoxifen and natural substances such as ring B-oxysterols and poly-unsaturated fatty acids.

References

External links 
 

EC 3.3.2